Organic anion transporter 4 (OAT4) can refer to either of these carrier proteins:
 Solute carrier family 22 member 9 (SLC22A9)
 Solute carrier family 22 member 11 (SLC22A11)